"Give Me That" is the first single by American rapper Webbie from his 2005 album Savage Life. The song features Bun B and was also used on Lil Boosie and Webbie's 2004 Album Gangsta Musik.

The single reached number 4 on the Billboard Hot Rap Tracks and number 29 on the Hot 100.

Sales and certifications
The single has been certified Gold by the RIAA for selling over 500,000 copies.

Charts

Weekly charts

Year-end charts

References

2005 debut singles
Webbie songs
Bun B songs
2004 songs
Asylum Records singles
Songs written by Snoop Dogg
Songs written by Chad Hugo
Songs written by Pharrell Williams
Songs written by Webbie
Songs written by Bun B